The William Spence House, at 308 S. Thompson St. in Carson City, Nevada, was built in 1875. It includes Greek Revival architecture. It was listed on the National Register of Historic Places in 1985.

It is a two-and-a-half-story, brick building on an  property.  It was built by William Mortimer Spence (1822–1920), who was a London-born cabinetmaker and pianowright, who came to the U.S. in 1860. He lived in the house until his death.
It was deemed significant as "an architecturally significant dwelling representative of transitional designs common to Carson City, Nevada, in the last quarter of the nineteenth century" and "also significant for its association with the early residential development of Carson City."

References 

Houses on the National Register of Historic Places in Nevada
Greek Revival houses in Nevada
Houses completed in 1875
National Register of Historic Places in Carson City, Nevada
Houses in Carson City, Nevada